Richard, Rich, Richie, or Dick Campbell may refer to:

Arts and entertainment 
Dick Campbell (producer) (1903–1994), key figure in black theater during the Harlem Renaissance
Dick Campbell (singer-songwriter) (1944–2002), US folk rock singer-songwriter and film producer
Rich Campbell (streamer), a member of gaming organization One True King
Richard Campbell (American musician) (born 1958), bass guitarist and vocalist
Richard Campbell (English musician) (1956–2011), cellist and viol player
Richard Campbell (The New Adventures of Old Christine), a fictional character
Richie Campbell (actor) (born 1982), British actor
Richie Campbell (singer) (born 1986), singer of reggae, dancehall, ska and soul music from Portugal

Politics, government, and law 
Dick Campbell (public servant) (1897–1974), New Zealand economist, civil servant, and diplomat
Richard Frederick Fotheringham Campbell (1831–1888), MP for Ayr Burghs
Richard Vary Campbell (1840–1901), Scottish advocate and author of legal books

Sports 
Dick Campbell (American football) (born 1935), former linebacker in the National Football League
Dick Campbell (Australian footballer) (1884–1949), Australian rules footballer
Dick Campbell (footballer, born 1953), Scottish association football manager and former player
Rich Campbell (American football) (born 1958), former National Football League quarterback
Richie Campbell (water polo) (born 1987), Australian water polo player

Other 
Richard Campbell (priest), Dean of Clonmacnoise